Yevgeny Kafelnikov defeated Thomas Enqvist in the final, 4–6, 6–0, 6–3, 7–6(7–1) to win the men's singles tennis title at the 1999 Australian Open. With the win, Kafelnikov became the first Russian (male or female) to win an Australian Open singles title.

Petr Korda was the defending champion, but lost in the third round to Todd Martin.

Seeds

Qualifying draw

Draw

Finals

Top half

Section 1

Section 2

Section 3

Section 4

Bottom half

Section 5

Section 6

Section 7

Section 8

External links
 Association of Tennis Professionals (ATP) – 1999 Australian Open Men's Singles draw
 1999 Australian Open – Men's draws and results at the International Tennis Federation

Mens singles
Australian Open (tennis) by year – Men's singles